Carolin Daniels (born 10 June 1992) is a German former professional tennis player.

On 26 October 2015, she reached her best singles ranking of world No. 363. On 2 November 2015, she peaked at No. 143 in the doubles rankings. In her career, she won one singles title and 18 doubles titles on the ITF Circuit.

Daniels made her WTA Tour main-draw debut at the 2015 Internationaux de Strasbourg, in the doubles draw, partnering Michelle Sammons.

ITF Circuit finals

Singles: 4 (1 title, 3 runner-ups)

Doubles: 38 (18 titles, 20 runner-ups)

External links
 
 

1992 births
Living people
German female tennis players
Sportspeople from Paderborn
Tennis people from North Rhine-Westphalia